Lupeni 29 is a 1962 Romanian drama film about the Lupeni strike of 1929, directed by Mircea Drăgan. It was entered into the 3rd Moscow International Film Festival where it won a Silver Prize.

Cast
  as Ioana
 Colea Răutu as Petre Letean
 George Calboreanu as Tudor Baci
 Ștefan Ciubotărașu as Varga
 Ilarion Ciobanu as Dăneț
  as the Mine Director
 Fory Etterle as the Prosecutor
  as the Gendarmerie officer
  as Mihăilă
  as the Officer Poet
 George Motoi as Ioana's first husband
  as Hudici
  as Mirică

References

External links
 

1962 films
1962 drama films
Romanian drama films
1960s Romanian-language films
Romanian black-and-white films
Films directed by Mircea Drăgan